Carrhotus xanthogramma is a species of 'jumping spiders' belonging to the family Salticidae.

Distribution
Its distribution is palearctic, including a portion of Europe (Portugal, Spain, France, Great Britain,  Ireland, Germany, Poland, Hungary, Austria, Switzerland, Italy, Slovenia, Croatia, Bosnia and Herzegovina, Serbia, North Macedonia, Romania, Bulgaria and Greece), in Turkey, Caucasus, Azerbaijan, Afghanistan, Russia, China, Mongolia, South Korea and Japan.

Habitat
These thermophilic spiders prefer sunny, warm environments. They can mainly be encountered on bushes, on tree trunks and shrubbery.

Description

These spiders are covered with dense hair. The sexual dimorphism of this species is pronounced.

The males are smaller than females. They have a black bright cephalothorax (prosoma) and a hairy, flattened and tapered, reddish-orange abdomen (opisthosoma). The separation between  cephalothorax (prosoma) and abdomen (opisthosoma) is well marked. Their black legs may have slightly orange rings. Palps are black haired. 

The female's body, according to the mimicry strategy, is mostly brownish, with dark brown markings. There is a yellowish area on a blackish front head, that includes an arcuate bandage extending from one side-eye to the other, encircling the entire back of the fore-body. 

The abdomen is oval and slightly tapered. It is predominantly yellowish, with narrow, dark brownish longitudinal V-shaped stripes and spots. Legs are light-dark annulated. Palps are light brown with long white hairs.  They have eight eyes with very large anterior median eyes.

Biology
Adults can be found in spring and summer, from April to July.  They actively pursue their prey, jumping on them. Their eyesight is excellent and very useful in their way of hunting.

Gallery

Bibliography
 Forster, L.M. (1982) - Vision and prey-catching strategies in jumping spiders - American Scientist 70: 165-175.
Fang WY, Wang ZL, Li C, Yang XQ, Yu XP - The complete mitogenome of a jumping spider Carrhotus xanthogramma (Araneae: Salticidae) and comparative analysis in four salticid mitogenomes.  
Heiko Bellmann: Der Kosmos Spinnenführer. Über 400 Arten Europas (= Kosmos Naturführer). Kosmos, Stuttgart 2010, S. 294.
Latreille, P. A. Articles sur les araignées. N. Dict. hist. nat. Paris. Ed. II, Paris, 22.
Maekawa, T. & Ikeda, H. (1992). Sexual behavior of a gynandromorphic spider of Carrhotus xanthogramma (Araneae: Salticidae). Acta Arachnologica 41: 103-108

References

External links
 Biolib
 Carrhotus xanthogramma

Salticidae
Palearctic spiders
Spiders of Europe
Spiders described in 1819
Articles containing video clips